Icon is a compilation album by American country music artist Josh Turner. It was released on March 22, 2011. It is part of a series of similar Icon albums released by Universal Music Enterprises. The album includes Turner's four number one singles ("Your Man," "Would You Go with Me," "Why Don't We Just Dance" and "All Over Me") as well as album tracks "As Fast as I Could" and "Backwoods Boy."

Critical reception

Thom Jurek of Allmusic notes the album "is all one needs for a definitive Turner playlist without any filler."

Commercial performance
Icon debuted at number 20 on the U.S. Billboard Top Country Albums chart and number 114 on the Billboard 200, selling 5,144 copies in the first week. It received a boost in May 2011 after an appearance by Turner on American Idol with Scotty McCreery, with 3,086 copies sold, and climbed to number 98 on the Billboard 200.  The album continued to sell, peaking at number 93 on Billboard 200 on chart dated December 8, 2012 based on Black Friday week sales of 12,990 copies.  It was certified Gold by the RIAA on June 3, 2019. As of October 2019, the album has sold 506,100 copies in the U.S.

Track listing

Charts

Weekly charts

Year-end charts

Certifications

References

2011 compilation albums
Josh Turner albums
MCA Records compilation albums